Mundo Universitário is a Portuguese free newspaper distributed at major universities in mainland Portugal. It was launched by the same founders of Destak in May 2004.

References

External links
 Mundo Universitário 

Newspapers published in Portugal
Student newspapers
Weekly newspapers published in Portugal
Portuguese-language newspapers
Free newspapers